The 1872 United States presidential election in Vermont took place on November 5, 1872. All contemporary 37 states were part of the 1872 United States presidential election. The state voters chose five electors to the Electoral College, which selected the president and vice president.

Vermont was won by the Republican nominees, incumbent President Ulysses S. Grant of Illinois and his running mate Senator Henry Wilson of Massachusetts. Grant and Wilson defeated the Liberal Republican and Democratic nominees, former Congressman Horace Greeley of New York and his running mate former Senator and Governor Benjamin Gratz Brown of Missouri by a margin of 57.67%.

With 78.29% of the popular vote, Vermont would be Grant's strongest victory in terms of percentage in the popular vote. Grant's performance in the state was the third best for a Republican presidential candidate only after William McKinley's 80.08% in 1896 and Grant's 78.57% from four years earlier.

Results

See also
 United States presidential elections in Vermont

References

Vermont
1872
1872 Vermont elections